Test::More is a unit testing module for Perl. Created and maintained by Michael G Schwern with help from Barrie Slaymaker, Tony Bowden, chromatic, Fergal Daly and perl-qa.

Test::More is the most popular Perl testing module, as of this 2010 about 80% of all CPAN distributions made use of it.

History
Introduced in 2001 to replace Test.pm, Test::More simplified the culture of testing in Perl leading to a proliferation of new testing modules and a strongly test driven community.

In January–March 2014 Michael Schwern transferred ownership of Test::More and related modules to Chad 'Exodist' Granum. On May 10, 2016 Exodist released version 1.302015 which included a complete refactor and partial rewrite of the internals. The new version includes major API updates and introduced several enhanced features. Extreme care was taken to preserve backwards compatibility for third party tools.

Functionality
Test::More is not a framework but can be used in conjunction with other testing libraries via a shared Test::Builder object. As a result, Test::More provides the baseline testing functions leaving other libraries to implement more specific and sophisticated functionality. This removes what would otherwise be a development bottleneck and allows a rich ecosystem of specialized niche testing functions.

Test::More is not a complete testing framework. Rather, test programs written with Test::More output their results as TAP which can then either be interpreted by a human, or more usually run through a TAP parser such as Test::Harness. It is this separation between test program and test result interpreter via a common protocol which allows Perl programmers to develop so many different testing modules and use them in combination. Additionally, the TAP output can be stored and reinterpreted later providing a historical record of test results.

Among its features are more comprehensive error messages, functions to test regular expressions, functions to test objects, and functions to test complex data structures. It can be used to compare values, such as a computed value to an expected value, or that a value is within an expected range. The number of tests to be executed is listed in the test script.

Tests that are known to fail under specific conditions or environments can be skipped. This may occur if a system on which the test is executed lacks the capability to execute the tested function, or if the test is written in advance of the code.

The module intercepts standard output from the Perl script to execute the tests.

References

External links
 Test::More documentation
 Test::More tutorial

Unit testing frameworks
Cross-platform software
Perl
Software using the Artistic license